The Wolfe Brothers are an Australian country music duo consisting of brothers Tom and Nick Wolfe. The group formerly included childhood friends Brodie Rainbird and Casey Kostiuk. The Wolfe Brothers rose to prominence after placing second in season six of Australia's Got Talent.

Career

Early years to 2012: Formation and Australia's Got Talent
Tom and Nick Wolfe grew up on a small berry farm outside Hobart, Tasmania. Their father Malcolm and uncle Tony played in a band with their parents, called The Wolfe Family Orchestra.

Nick Wolfe says, "We come from four generations of farmers and musicians." Their father guided Nick to the guitar and Tom to the piano, perhaps with "the intention of starting a band with us". Their mother filled the family home with music, exposing her children to 1990s country staples like Garth Brooks and Billy Ray Cyrus.

The Wolfe Brothers were formed by brothers Nick (guitar and vocals) and Tom Wolfe (bass and vocals), Brodie Rainbird (guitar) and Casey Kostiuk (drums). During their high school years all four played in different bands, covering songs by their glam rock and heavy metal music heroes. After leaving school they formed The Wolfe Brothers, and for six years played covers in pubs and clubs across Tasmania.

In May 2010, The Wolfe Brothers self-released a self-titled debut EP.

In 2012, The Wolfe Brothers auditioned for the sixth season of Australia's Got Talent, where they placed second behind Andrew De Silva.

2013-2019: It’s On to Country Heart

In January 2013, The Wolfe Brothers released their debut studio album It's On, which peaked at number 18 on the ARIA Charts. The album spawned three county top 10 singles, including their first #1 song and #1 video "The Girl, The Bottle, The Memory".

The Wolfe Brothers were special guests on Lee Kernaghan's 2013–2014 Beautiful Noise Tour.

At the 2014 Country Music Awards of Australia, The Wolfe Brothers were nominated for four awards and won the New Australian Artist of the Year at the CMC Music Awards.

In September 2014, The Wolfe Brothers released their second studio album, Nothin' But Trouble, which peaked at number 13 on the ARIA Charts. The album spawned the single "That Kinda Night", which reached number 1 on the country singles chart. The album's second and third singles, "You Got to Me" and "Born and Bred" became the group's third and fourth number 1 on the country charts and the CMC video chart.

In September 2015, a live album titled Live at CMC Rocks QLD 2015 was released.

The group supported Kernaghan on his 2015 The Songs and the Stories Tour. Tom Wolfe later saying, "Touring with Lee has been a dream come true for us. He has taught us so much and it is still a little surreal to look across the stage and realise we are actually performing with one of our childhood heroes – the great Lee Kernaghan".

In June 2016, the group released their third studio album, This Crazy Life album, which peaked at number 10 on the ARIA charts. The album was recorded in Nashville, USA over three months between November 2015 and February 2016 under the guidance of producer Luke Wooten.

In 2016, The Wolfe Brothers were nominated in three categories in the CMC Music Awards, winning the CMC Group of the Year Award; their second CMC Award.

Late in 2016, Nick and Tom's father, Malcolm died of cancer.

In 2017 they recorded the single "Damn Good Mates" with Lee Kernaghan for Kernaghan's 25th Anniversary Album. In 2017 The Wolfe Brothers won Australian Group/Duo of the Year at the Planet Country's Music for a New Generation Awards.

In April 2018, the group released their fourth studio album Country Heart, which peaked at number 9 on the ARIA Charts. The singles "Ain't Seen It Yet" and "Country Heart" both reaching number 1 on the country singles chart.

At the 2019 Country Music Awards of Australia, the group won including Album of the Year, Contemporary Country Album of the Year, Group or Duo of the Year and  Song of the Year with "Ain't Seen It Yet".

2020-present: Kids on Cassette to Livin' the Dream
In March 2020, Brodie Rainbird announced he is leaving the group as Casey Kostiuk had done some years earlier. However, both continue to play with the duo on tour.

In April 2020 the band worldwide deal with global independent label, BMG, in partnership with the BBR Music Group.

On 17 April 2020, the group released their first single on the label entitled "No Breaks".

The Wolfe Brothers' fifth studio album, Kids on Cassette was released in July 2021, the same day they celebrated their 15th consecutive #1 single on the Country Airplay Charts with "Startin' Something" The album debuted at number 6 on the ARIA Charts.

In November 2021, they joined Australian-born, Canadian country artist Gord Bamford for the Australian version of his single "Drink Along Song" in 2021.

The Wolfe Brothers were nominated for seven awards at the 2022 CMAAs, winning two.

In April 2022, the Wolfe Brothers commenced their Startin' Something tour across Australia.

The Wolfe Brothers' sixth studio album Livin' the Dream is scheduled for release on 14 April 2023. The album was written during the pandemic over Zoom writing sessions with writers all over the world. Nick Wolfe produced the album with Rod McCormack and Matt Fell. Nick said "Sonically, Livin' the Dream is a conscious decision by us to get back to our country roots. We explored a lot of pop and rock territory on our last record but we want to come out of the gate swinging country style and give everyone a taste of what's to come for the rest of this record that we're really proud of."

Discography

Albums

Studio albums

Live albums

Extended plays

Awards and nominations

AIR Awards
The Australian Independent Record Awards (commonly known informally as AIR Awards) is an annual awards night to recognise, promote and celebrate the success of Australia's Independent Music sector.

! 
|-
| 2019
|Country Heart
| Best Independent Country Album
| 
| 
|-
| 2022
| Kids on Cassette
| Best Independent Country Album or EP
| 
|

APRA Awards
The APRA Awards are presented annually from 1982 by the Australasian Performing Right Association (APRA), "honouring composers and songwriters". They commenced in 1982.

! 
|-
| 2014 
| "The Girl, the Bottle, the Memory" (Nicholas Wolfe)
| Country Work of the Year
| 
| 
|-

ARIA Music Awards
The ARIA Music Awards is an annual awards ceremony that recognises excellence, innovation, and achievement across all genres of Australian music.The Wolfe Brothers have been nominated thrice.

! 
|-
| 2016
| This Crazy Life
| Best Country Album
| 
|
|-
| 2018
| Country Heart
| Best Country Album
| 
|
|-
| 2021
| Kids on Cassette
| Best Country Album
| 
| 
|-

Country Music Awards of Australia
The Country Music Awards of Australia (CMAA) (also known as the Golden Guitar Awards) is an annual awards night held in January during the Tamworth Country Music Festival, in Tamworth, New South Wales, celebrating recording excellence in the Australian country music industry. The Wolfe Brothers have won five awards.

|-
| rowspan="4"| 2014
| It's On
| Top Selling Album of the Year
| 
|-
| rowspan="3"| "The Girl, The Bottle, The Memory"
| Group or Duo of the Year
| 
|-
| Song of the Year
| 
|-
| New Talent of the Year
| 
|-
| rowspan="2"| 2015
| Nothin' But Trouble
| Group or Duo of the Year
| 
|-
| "That Kinda Night"
| Single of the Year
| 
|-
| rowspan="4"| 2016
| "The Girl, The Bottle, The Memory" (written by Nick Wolfe)
| Song of the Year
| 
|-
| The Wolfe Brothers
| Group of the Year
| 
|-
| (unknown)
| (unknown)
| 
|-
| (unknown)
| (unknown)
| 
|-
| rowspan="2"| 2017
| rowspan="2"| This Crazy Life
| Group or Duo of the Year
| 
|-
| Album of the Year
| 
|-
| rowspan="6"| 2019
| rowspan="3"| Country Heart
| Contemporary Country Album of the Year
| 
|-
| Country Album of the Year
| 
|-
| Group or Duo of the Year
| 
|-
| rowspan="2"| "Ain't Seen It Yet"
| Song of the Year
| 
|-
| Single of the Year
| 
|-
| "Ain't Seen It Yet" (Director: Joshua Favaloro)
| Video of the Year
| 
|-
|rowspan="3"| 2020 
| "Hey Brother" 
| Single of the Year 
| 
|-
| "Hey Brother" (Jay Seeney, Blacklist Productions) 
| Video of the Year 
| 
|-
| "Till It Ends" (with Lee Kernaghan) 
|Vocal Collaboration of the Year 
| 
|-
| 2021
| "No Brakes"
| Single of the Year
| 
|-
| rowspan="7"| 2022
| rowspan="2"| Kids on Cassette
| Album of the Year
| 
|-
| Contemporary Country Album of the Year
| 
|-
| rowspan="2"| "Kids on Cassette"
| AMCOS Song of the Year 
| 
|-
| Video of the Year
| 
|-
| "Startin' Something" (with LOCASH)
| Vocal Collaboration of the Year
| 
|-
| "Small Town Song"
| Heritage Song of the Year
| 
|-
| The Wolfe Brothers
| News Group or Duo of the Year
| 
|-
|rowspan="2"| 2023 || "Something Good's Gonna Happen" featuring Amy Sheppard (Directed by Jay Seeney) || Video of the Year || 
|-
| "All Or Nothing"  (Written by Adam Brand, Nicholas Wolfe and Tom Wolfe) – Recorded by Adam Brand || Song of the Year || 
|-

Country Music Association Awards
The Country Music Association Awards (CMA) are and annual American awards show which honours country music artists and broadcasters and recognizes outstanding achievement in the country music industry. The Wolfe Brothers have one nomination.

! 
|-
| 2022
| The Wolfe Brothers
| Global Country Artist Award
| 
| 
|-

CMC Awards
The CMC Awards are awarded annually by Country Music Channel Australia.

 (wins only)
! 
|-
| 2014|| The Wolfe Brothers || New Australian Artist of the Year||  || 
|-
| 2016|| The Wolfe Brothers ||  CMC Group Of The Year ||  || 
|-

National Live Music Awards
The National Live Music Awards (NLMAs) are a broad recognition of Australia's diverse live industry, celebrating the success of the Australian live scene. The awards commenced in 2016.

! 
|-
| 2019
| The Wolfe Brothers
| Live Country Act of the Year
| 
| 
|-

References

2010 establishments in Australia
Australian country music groups
Australian country rock groups
Australian musical groups
Tasmanian musical groups
Musicians from Tasmania
Australia's Got Talent contestants